The Indian Consul-General to the French Establishments in India (French India) was the chief diplomatic representative of India to the French Republic for the French Establishments in India housed in the 7 rue de Capuchins, Pondicherry. It was created after Indian independence in 1947 and existed until the de facto transfer of the French possessions to India on 1 November 1954.

The inaugural Consul-General for India in the French Establishments in India at Pondicherry was Mirza Rashid Ali Baig who held the post between 1947 and 1949. This consulate had jurisdiction over the Portuguese possessions in India as well The last diplomat who hold this office was Kewal Singh who took charge as Chief Commissioner shortly before the de facto transfer in 1954.

List of Consuls-general

Cessation of consulate
De facto transfer of the French Establishments in India occurred on 1 November 1954. 
A Chief Commissioner, appointed by Government of India, replaced the last French Commissioner of French India, Georges Escargueil. Then consul-general Kewal Singh was appointed as the first Chief Commissioner of French Establishments in India, immediately after the Kizhoor referendum, on 21 October 1954, as per Foreign Jurisdiction Act, 1947. The Chief Commissioner had the powers of the former French commissioner, but was under the direct control of the Union Government.

See also
 Puducherry
 List of lieutenant governors of Puducherry

References

Puducherry-related lists
1947 establishments in India
1954 disestablishments in India
India history-related lists